Johannes Enen (1483–1519) was a Roman Catholic prelate who served as Auxiliary Bishop of Trier (1517–1519).

Biography
Johannes Enen was born in Ehnen, Luxembourg in 1483. On 13 Nov 1517, he was appointed during the papacy of Pope Leo X as Auxiliary Bishop of Trier and Titular Bishop of Azotus. He served as the Auxiliary Bishop of Trier until his death on 31 Jul 1519.

References 

16th-century Roman Catholic bishops in the Holy Roman Empire
Bishops appointed by Pope Leo X
1483 births
1519 deaths